The cortistatins are a group of steroidal alkaloids first isolated in 2006 from the marine sponge Corticium simplex.  The cortistatins were first discovered in a search for naturally occurring compounds that inhibit proliferation of human umbilical vein endothelial cells (HUVECs), with cortistatin A being the most potent compound in the class.

The Shair group at Harvard along with collaborators have shown that cortistatin A is a highly potent and selective inhibitor of CDK8 and CDK19, the kinases that associate with Mediator complex. Out of 386 kinases evaluated, cortistatin A only inhibited CDK8 and CDK19, revealing that it is among the most selective kinase inhibitors. It was also shown that cortistatin A potently inhibits growth of acute myeloid leukemia cells and AML in two in vivo mouse models. Identification of dominant drug-resistant alleles of CDK8 and CDK19 demonstrate that these kinases mediate the activity of cortistatin A in AML cells. Thus, inhibition of CDK8 and CDK19 is a new therapeutic approach to AML. Cortistatin A caused selective and disproportionate up-regulation of super-enhancer-associated genes in AML cells which contributed to its anti-leukemic activity. This work indicated that CDK8 and CDK19 are negative regulators of super-enhancer-associated genes in AML.

Di-dehydrocortistatin A suppresses viral replication in cells infected with HIV via binding to the Tat protein.

Cortistatin A was synthesized by the Shair, Myers, Baran and Nicolaou labs.

Chemical structures

References 

Steroidal alkaloids